Horikawa (written: 堀川 or 堀河) is a Japanese surname. Notable people with the surname include:

, Japanese voice actor
, Japanese anime producer
, Japanese volleyball player
, Japanese model and singer-songwriter
, Japanese actor and voice actor
, Japanese footballer

Japanese-language surnames